Edy Schütz (born 15 May 1941) was a Luxembourgish professional road bicycle racer. In 1964, Schütz rode in the individual road race at the 1964 Olympic Games. From 1966 to 1971 he was six times the Luxembourgish national road race champion. In 1966, he won a stage in the 1966 Tour de France.

Major results

1964
Österreich-Rundfahrt
1966
 national road race champion
Tour de Luxembourg
Tour de France:
Winner stage 18
1967
 national road race champion
1968
 national road race champion
Tour de Luxembourg
1969
 national road race champion
1970
 national road race champion
Tour de Luxembourg
1971
 national road race champion

References

External links 

Official Tour de France results for Edy Schütz

1941 births
Living people
Luxembourgian male cyclists
Luxembourgian Tour de France stage winners
Cyclists at the 1964 Summer Olympics
Olympic cyclists of Luxembourg
People from Kayl